Sir William Stanier School is a co-educational secondary school located in Crewe in the English county of Cheshire. The school is named after William Stanier, a former railway engineer, and Chief Mechanical Engineer of the London, Midland and Scottish Railway.

History
The school was first established in 1977 as Coppenhall High School, after the amalgamation of two local schools; Brierley Street Boys School and Brierley Street Girls School.

In 2005 it was announced that Coppenhall High School would amalgamate with another local school, Victoria Community Technology School due to low enrollment rates in the Crewe and Nantwich areas. The schools formally amalgamated on the Coppenhall High site in September 2007 and was renamed Sir William Stanier School. New school buildings were then designed by Aedas and constructed by Willmott Dixon from 2010.

Previously a community school administered by Cheshire East Council, in September 2013 Sir William Stanier School converted to academy status. The school was then sponsored by the Congleton Multi-Academy Trust, however the trust merged with the Knutsford Multi-Academy Trust in September 2020 to form The Learning Alliance.

In 2021, for personal reasons, Jason Fraser, the Principal, and Anna Norton, the Vice Principal, resigned from their positions. The school got a new principal, Liam McDaid, who was the principal of the Crewe Engineering & Design UTC.

The school was rumoured, with documents sent out to pupils and parents, to be renaming.

As of 2022, Nicki Gregg, formerly the Head of School, has become the principal, with Liam McDaid becoming Executive Principal of The Learning Alliance.

Academics
Sir William Stanier School offers GCSEs and BTECs as programmes of study for pupils. The school also has a specialism in Science.

References

External links

Buildings and structures in Crewe
Secondary schools in the Borough of Cheshire East
Academies in the Borough of Cheshire East
Educational institutions established in 1977
1977 establishments in England